International Squadron (aka Flight Patrol) is a 1941 American war film directed by Lewis Seiler and Lothar Mendes that starred Ronald Reagan, Olympe Bradna and in his final film, James Stephenson. The film is based on the Eagle Squadrons, American pilots who volunteered to fly for the Royal Air Force during World War II. International Squadron featured noted Hollywood pilot Paul Mantz who acted as the film's aerial coordinator and flew during the production.

Plot
Royal Air Force Squadron Leader Charles Wyatt (James Stephenson) asks his friend, Jimmy Grant (Ronald Reagan), a daredevil pilot on the airshow circuit, to join the RAF's International Squadron, made up of Americans. Jimmy turns him down, saying that he intends to stay safe at home. Faced with a breach-of-promise suit, Jimmy, however, is hired to deliver a new American-designed Lockheed Hudson bomber to the RAF, flying to England with his mechanic, "Omaha" McGrath (Cliff Edwards). When they encounter a heavy fog over the English base, Jimmy ignores a request from Charles to bail out, and brings the bomber in to a safe landing.

While in London, Jimmy meets up with an old friend, Rog Wilkins (William Lundigan) now serving in the International Squadron. Jeanette (Olympe Bradna), the young French woman assigned as his driver, he asks her out for dinner. A German raid hits the city. Jimmy is impressed by the courage of the embattled Londoners and moved by the death of a young child, to join the fight.

In the RAF, Jimmy is not able to fit in, and during an air patrol, while he shots down a German bomber, his reckless flying results in the death of an RAF comrade. The only thing that saves him from dismissal is the intervention of Charles. The next occasion when Jimmy can make amends ends badly as he wants to take Jeanette out, appealing to Rog to stand in for him. Despite being on call for 20 hours, Rog flies his patrol, and is shot down and killed.

In despair, Jimmy wants to quit but Charles persuades him to stay and avenge his friend's death. When Jeanette's boyfriend, Michele Edmé (Tod Andrews) is selected for a dangerous bombing mission over Nazi-held territory, Jimmy knocks him out and takes his place. Caught by enemy aircraft, Jimmy shoots two down, successfully completing his bombing run but is overwhelmed and shot down, crashing to his death. At his airbase, the International Squadron drinks a toast in tribute to him.

Cast

 Ronald Reagan as Jimmy Grant
 Olympe Bradna as  Jeanette
 James Stephenson as  Squadron Leader Charles Wyatt
 William Lundigan  as Lt. Rog Wilkins
 Joan Perry as Connie Wilkins
 Reginald Denny as Wing Commander Severn
 Cliff Edwards  as Omaha McGrath
 Julie Bishop as Mary Wyatt
 Tod Andrews as Michele Edmé
 John Ridgely as Bill Torrence
 Charles Irwin as  Biddle
 Addison Richards as Chief Engineer
 Selmer Jackson as  Saunders
 Holmes Herbert as Sir Basil Wryxton
 Joan Perry as Connie Wilkins

Production
When American pilots went to war in the R.A.F. Eagle Squadrons, it set off a minor war between several of the Hollywood studios. Producer Walter Wanger had immediately copyrighted the name of "Eagle Squadron" for his film of the same name that appeared in early 1942. Producer Darryl F. Zanuck of 20th Century Fox wrote angry letters to Hal Wallis of Warner Bros. accusing them of not only stealing his idea of his A Yank in the R.A.F. but making a low budget B picture to beat Fox's prestigious production to the screen.

Zanuck threatened legal action unless Warners stopped the film from being made or not to release their film until 60 days after Zanuck's film was released. Warners ignored Zanuck as the Eagle Squadrons were a major news item of the day and Warners based their screenplay on a film made by the studio Ceiling Zero based on a play by Frank Wead.  They did change the film's original title from Eagle Squadron to Flight Patrol then finally International Squadron and released it two months before A Yank in the R.A.F.

Warners acquired another boost by hiring Byron Kennerly, a former member of an Eagle Squadron as the film's technical advisor. Kennerly had written a magazine story Squadron 71, Scramble! A Day in the Eagle Squadron, R.A.F. that was published in the July 1941 issue of Harper's Magazine and was in the process of writing a book The Eagles Roar! that Warners bought the rights to. However, according to some sources Kennerly left the Eagle Squadron before their first engagement; with some sources saying he was on furlough for an ear ailment. Kennerly later served with the United States Army Air Forces and was jailed for bank robbery in February 1951.

Actual film of dogfighting between Spitfires and Messerschmitts and Heinkels and a London air raid were shot by Warners' Teddington studios technicians and shipped to the United States for inclusion in the film.

The modest budget for International Squadron necessitated the use of the Alhambra, California Municipal Airport standing in for an RAF base, and a bevy of contemporary civil aircraft standing in for the latest RAF fighters. The unlikely group included a Mantz's Boeing Model 100, Brown B-3 Racer, three Ryan STA trainers and a Travel Air Type R Mystery Ship.

Reception
International Squadron was favorably reviewed by Theodore Strauss for  The New York Times, who said: "As another aerial and romantic dog-fight in the hurtling succession of epics about the Royal Air Force, it breezes along with dash and bravado and not too much self-importance. Its emotional upheavals are tossed off with a wisecrack; it doesn't belabor its story with inspirational organ music, and it keeps its wheels well off the ground. No ace among war films, it is none the less a brisk, brash flier in pulse-quickening entertainment."

See also
 A Yank in the R.A.F.
 Eagle Squadron
 Higher Than a Kite

References

Notes

Bibliography

 Glancy, H. Mark. When Hollywood Loved Britain: The Hollywood 'British' Film 1939-1945. Manchester University Press, 1999.
 Klinkowitz, Jerome. Yanks Over Europe: American Flyers in World War II. Lexington, Kentucky: University Press of Kentucky, 1996. .
 Orriss, Bruce. When Hollywood Ruled the Skies: The Aviation Film Classics of World War II. Hawthorne, California: Aero Associates Inc., 1984. .
 Pendo, Stephen. Aviation in the Cinema. Lanham, Maryland: Scarecrow Press, 1985. .

External links
 }
 

1941 films
American war films
Films set in England
Films set in London
World War II films made in wartime
Films set in the 1940s
Films directed by Arthur Lubin
Warner Bros. films
American aviation films
American black-and-white films
Ronald Reagan
Films scored by William Lava
Films directed by Lothar Mendes
1941 war films
1940s English-language films